Michel Tremblay (born March 28, 1933 in Cap-à-l'Aigle, Quebec) is a politician from Québec, Canada. A teacher by profession, he served in several education-related positions in the Bas-Saint-Laurent region before being elected to the National Assembly of Quebec as a Liberal in Rimouski in 1985.  After being re-elected in 1989, he was defeated in 1994.

He served as mayor of Rimouski from 1994 to 2005. He ran unsuccessfully as a Liberal in Rimouski-Neigette—Témiscouata—Les Basques in the 2006 federal election.

Since December 2006, he has been chairman of the board of CJEM-FM in Edmundston, New Brunswick.

External links
 
 Tremblay's biography on the Liberal Party's website

1933 births
Living people
Candidates in the 2006 Canadian federal election
Quebec Liberal Party MNAs
Mayors of Rimouski
Vice Presidents of the National Assembly of Quebec
Liberal Party of Canada candidates for the Canadian House of Commons